Karen Lewis was an American labor leader who served as president of the Chicago Teachers Union from 2010 to 2014.

Karen Lewis may also refer to:
Karen Lewis (screenwriter) (born 1950s), American television soap opera writer
Karen Lewis Young (born 1951), member of the Maryland House of Delegates since 2015
Karen Lewis, actress and spouse of Michael Attenborough